1,4-Butynediol is an organic compound that is an alkyne and a diol.  It is a colourless, hygroscopic solid that is soluble in water and polar organic solvents. It is a commercially significant compound in its own right and as a precursor to other products.

Synthesis
1,4-Butynediol can be produced in the Reppe synthesis, where formaldehyde and acetylene are the reactants:
2 CH2O  +  HC≡CH  →  HOCH2CCCH2OH

Several patented production methods use copper bismuth catalysts coated on an inert material. The normal temperature range for the reaction is 90 °C up to 150 °C, depending on the pressure used for the reaction which can range from 1 to 20 bar.

Applications 
1,4-Butynediol is a precursor to 1,4-butanediol and 2-butene-1,4-diol by hydrogenation.   It is also used in the manufacture of certain herbicides, textile additives, corrosion inhibitors, plasticizers, synthetic resins, and polyurethanes.  It is the major raw material used in the synthesis of vitamin B6.  It is also used for brightening, preserving, and inhibiting nickel plating.

It reacts with a mixture of chlorine and hydrochloric acid to give mucochloric acid, HO2CC(Cl)=C(Cl)CHO (see mucobromic acid).

Safety 
1,4-Butynediol is corrosive and irritates the skin, eyes, and respiratory tract.

See also
cis-Butene-1,4-diol

References 

Alkyne derivatives
Diols